The 1897–98 Scottish Second Division was won by Kilmarnock with Motherwell finishing bottom.

Table

References

Scottish Football Archive

Scottish Division Two seasons
2